John E. Youngs (August 2, 1883 – December 18, 1970) was a member of the Wisconsin State Assembly.

Biography
Youngs was born on August 2, 1883, in Plainfield, Wisconsin. He later became a barber. He died in Oconto on December 18, 1970.

Political career
Youngs was a member of the Assembly from 1938 to 1950. Additionally, he was a member of the Oconto County, Wisconsin Board of Supervisors and the Oconto, Wisconsin Board of Education (similar to school board). He was a Republican.

References

External links
The Political Graveyard

People from Plainfield, Wisconsin
People from Oconto, Wisconsin
Republican Party members of the Wisconsin State Assembly
County supervisors in Wisconsin
School board members in Wisconsin
Barbers
1883 births
1970 deaths
20th-century American politicians